Renee Gracie (born 5 January 1995) is an Australian adult film actress and former racing driver.

Racing career

2013–2014
After a successful stint in kart racing, Gracie contested the 2014 and 2015 seasons of the Porsche Carrera Cup Australia Championship.  In 2013, she was the first female to compete in that championship.  The following year, she achieved five top 10 race results and a 100 percent race finishing record.

2015
In 2015, Gracie switched to the Supercars Dunlop Series, in which she drove for Paul Morris Motorsport, and was the first full-time female competitor in 14 years.  At the end of that year, she was classified 18th in the championship standings, with 634 points and a best race result of 12th.

On 19 August 2015, it was announced that Gracie would partner Simona de Silvestro in a Ford FG X Falcon fielded by Prodrive Racing Australia in the Bathurst 1000 for V8 Supercars.  It was the first female pairing at Bathurst since Melinda Price and Kerryn Brewer finished 11th in 1998. On lap 15 of the race, the Falcon, running under the "Harvey Norman Supergirls" banner, was severely damaged in an oil slick-induced impact by Gracie with the wall at Forrest's Elbow.  After undergoing extensive repairs, it was sent back out, with de Silvestro at the wheel, to finish 21st, 40 laps down on the winning pair of Craig Lowndes and Steven Richards.

2016
In 2016, Gracie competed in her second season of the Supercars Dunlop Series, once again for Paul Morris Motorsport.  She also teamed up with de Silvestro for a second assault at the Bathurst 1000, this time in a Nissan Altima L33 prepared by Nissan Motorsport. Despite starting the race on the back row in 26th position, Gracie and de Silvestro had no major issues during the race, and managed stay out of trouble to finish 14th in the chaotic final laps.

2017
Gracie moved to Dragon Motor Sport for a third season in the renamed Super2 Series. After a string of poor results with only one top-10 finish in 17 races and a lack of available funds, she was replaced with Kumho Series driver Jordan Boys.

Adult film career
In 2019, Gracie began working as an adult film actress and uploading adult content to subscription site OnlyFans, claiming “racing cars is not my passion anymore." Gracie joined the adult industry after not being able to make money from racing cars. Her father also supports her career in pornography. Renee Gracie used her earnings from her career in pornography to buy a Mercedes Supercar for AU$350,000.

Motorsports career results

Career summary

Complete Super2 Series results
(key) (Round results only)

Complete Supercars Championship results

Complete Bathurst 1000 results

References

External link
 Renee Gracie career at Driver Database

1995 births
Living people
Racing drivers from Brisbane
Australian female racing drivers
Actresses from Brisbane
People educated at John Paul College (Brisbane)
OnlyFans creators
Australian pornographic film actresses
People from the Gold Coast, Queensland
Nismo drivers
Kelly Racing drivers